The Meriwether Monument is a pillar erected in 1916 at John C. Calhoun Park in North Augusta, South Carolina, to commemorate Thomas McKie Meriwether (December 4, 1852 – July 8, 1876), the only white man killed in the Hamburg massacre when white supremacist militias attacked African Americans in coordinated political violence, seeking to restore the Democratic Party to power and disenfranchise African American voters. The massacre occurred in 1876 and was part of a violent political campaign at the end of the Reconstruction era. The monument was erected 40 years later during the Jim Crow era. Protests at the monument were organized in 2020 after the murder of George Floyd as part of Black Lives Matter activism.

Alterations to the park including interpretive panels have been proposed. One of Meriwether's descendants has called for the monument to be taken down.

An inscription on the marker states: "In life he exemplified the highest ideal of Anglo-Saxon civilization. By his death he assured to the children of his beloved land the supremacy of that ideal."

John C. Calhoun was a politician from South Carolina who served as vice-president of the United States. He was an adamant defender of slavery.

See also
 Ellenton massacre
 Disputed government of South Carolina of 1876-77
 1876 United States presidential election
 List of places named for John C. Calhoun

References

1916 establishments in South Carolina
1916 sculptures
Buildings and structures in Aiken County, South Carolina